The 1978 Campeonato Nacional was Chilean first tier's 46th season. Palestino was the tournament's champion, winning its second title.

Standings

Results

Topscorer

Liguilla Pre-Copa Libertadores

Liguilla play-off match 

O'Higgins qualified to 1979 Copa Libertadores due to its better League position

Promotion/relegation Liguilla

* There was no promotion or relegation.

References

External links 
ANFP 
RSSSF Chile 1978

Primera División de Chile seasons
Chile
Prim